Kelly Doton (born February 2, 1982, in Greenfield, Massachusetts) is a field hockey defender from the United States, who earned her first international cap vs New Zealand on April 14, 2005, in Virginia Beach. Doton, nicknamed Dote, attended Wake Forest University. Doton was named as the Head field hockey coach at Boston College in the Spring of 2015.

Doton was named ACC coach of the year in 2019.

College
In 2004, while at Wake Forest, Doton won the Honda Sports Award as the nation's best field hockey player.

International senior competitions

 2005 – Champions Challenge, Virginia Beach (5th)
 2006 – World Cup Qualifier, Rome (4th)
 2006 – World Cup, Madrid (6th)
 2007 – Pan American Games, Rio de Janeiro (2nd)

References

External links
 
 USA Field Hockey

1982 births
Living people
American female field hockey players
People from Greenfield, Massachusetts
Wake Forest Demon Deacons field hockey players
Field hockey players at the 2007 Pan American Games
Field hockey players at the 2008 Summer Olympics
Olympic field hockey players of the United States
Boston College Eagles field hockey coaches
Pan American Games competitors for the United States